Firefight or fire fight may refer to:

 Firefighting, process of extinguishing destructive flames
 Shootout or firefight, a gun battle between armed groups

Entertainment and media
 Fire Fight, an isometric shooter produced by Epic MegaGames and Electronic Arts
 Firefight, a multiplayer game mode in the Halo 3: ODST and Halo: Reach video games
 Firefight (album), an album by the Montreal-based melodic death metal band Blackguard
 Firefight, a book in The Reckoners series by Brandon Sanderson
 Firefight, a 2003 novel by Thomas Easton
 Fire Fight Australia, a benefit concert held in Sydney in February 2020 to raise funds for the national bushfire relief following the Black Summer fires.